The United States ambassador to Uganda is the official representative of the government of the United States to the Government of Uganda.

Ambassadors

See also 
Uganda – United States relations
Foreign relations of Uganda
Ambassadors of the United States

References
United States Department of State: Background notes on Uganda

External links
 United States Department of State: Chiefs of Mission for Uganda
 United States Department of State: Uganda
 United States Embassy in Kampala

Uganda
United States